Gresford Athletic Football Club is a football team based in Gresford, near Wrexham, Wales. They are members of the Cymru North, which is in the second tier of the Welsh football league system and play at The Rock in Rhosymedre, as from March 2023. The club is recognised as being founded in 1946, although it is known that the club existed in the 1920s.

Current staff

Committee

Technical staff

Managerial history

First Team squad

Stadium 
{
  "type": "FeatureCollection",
  "features": [
    {
      "type": "Feature",
      "properties": {},
      "geometry": {
        "type": "Point",
        "coordinates": [
          -3.069646,
          52.977212
        ]
      }
    }
  ]
}The Rock, Rhosymedre

Capacity: 3,000 (500 Seating)

Pitch: 3G

Car Parking: Yes

Refreshments: Yes

League history

Honours
Welsh National League Premier
Champions (3): 1995–96; 2000–01; 2014–15
Welsh National West Division
Champions (1): 1946–47
Welsh National Division Two
Champions (1): 1962–63
Welsh National Division Three A
Champions (1): 1969–70
FAW Reserve League North East
Champions (1): 2021–22
Welsh National League Premier Cup
Winners (2): 2010–2011; 2011–2012
Runners Up (1): 2014–15
Welsh National League Division One Cup
Winners (2): 2004–2005; 2005–2006
Welsh National League Division Two Cup
Winners (3): 1966–67; 1992–93; 2006–07
North East Wales FA Challenge Cup 
Winners (3): 1973–74; 1992–93; 2016–17
Runners Up (1): 2018–19
Welsh Trophy
Runners Up (1): 2000–01
Cymru Alliance League Cup
Runners Up (2): 1992–93; 2017–18
Horace Wynne Cup
Runners Up (1): 2005–06
Division One League Cup
Runners Up (2): 1990–91; 1998–99

References

External links
 Official Website
Twitter
Instagram
YouTube
Issuu

Football clubs in Wales
Football clubs in Wrexham
Sport in Wrexham County Borough
Association football clubs established in 1946
Welsh National League (Wrexham Area) Premier Division clubs
1946 establishments in Wales
Cymru Alliance clubs
Cymru North clubs